Route 31 is a name for roads and highways in many countries.

Route 31 may also refer to:

Route 31 (MTA Maryland), a bus route in metropolitan Baltimore, Maryland, U.S.
Route 31 (WMATA), a bus route on Wisconsin Avenue in Washington, D.C., U.S.
London Buses route 31, UK

31